Hyblaea xanthia is a moth in the family Hyblaeidae described by George Hampson in 1910. It is found in the Democratic Republic of the Congo (Katanga), the Seychelles (Aldabra), South Africa and Zambia.

References

Hyblaeidae
Moths described in 1910